Ken Lucas may refer to:
 Ken Lucas (politician)
 Ken Lucas (wrestler)
 Ken Lucas (American football)
 Kenny and Keith Lucas, American comedian